Boskovich is a surname. Notable people with the surname include:

Alexander Uriah Boskovich (1907–1964), Israeli composer
John S. Boskovich (1956–2006), American artist, writer, filmmaker, and teacher

See also
Bošković
Boskovich Farms